Tomsk Avia, LLC was an airline based at Bogashevo Airport in Tomsk, Russia. It operated domestic passenger and cargo services and charters until 2015.

History

The airline was established in 1992 from the Aeroflot Tomsk division (established in 1932) and merged with Kolpashevo Air Enterprise in 1999. Formerly called Tomsk Production Aviation Amalgamation and Tomsk State Aviation Enterprise.

In April 2015, the airline's Air operator's certificate was suspended by Rosaviatsia as a result of the carrier's financial difficulties. Tomsk Avia's AOC was officially canceled in July 2015

The airline's debt had become a concern to Russian aviation authorities. The company's director was charged with 18 criminal offenses including failing to obey the court's orders regarding the debts. In March 2015, court officers seized two airports owned by the carrier, Strezhevoy Airport and Kargasok.

After the suspension, the fleet of Antonov An-24 and  Antonov An-26 aircraft was seized and sold.

Destinations
Tomskavia operated scheduled flights to the following domestic destinations:
 Altai Republic
Gorno-Altaysk - Gorno-Altaysk Airport
 Altai Krai
Barnaul - German Titov Barnaul International Airport
 Kemerovo Oblast
Kemerovo - Kemerovo International Airport
Novokuznetsk - Spichenkovo Airport
 Khakassia
Abakan - Abakan Airport
 Novosibirsk Oblast
Novosibirsk - Tolmachevo Airport
 Tomsk Oblast
Strezhevoy - Strezhevoy Airport
Tomsk - Bogashevo Airport
 Tyumen Oblast
 Khanty-Mansi Autonomous District
Nizhnevartovsk - Nizhnevartovsk Airport
Surgut - Surgut Airport

Fleet

The Tomskavia fleet included the following aircraft in July 2012):

 6 Antonov An-24
 2 Antonov An-26
 1 Cessna 208B Grand Caravan 
 13 Mil Mi-8T

References

External links

  

Airlines established in 1992
Airlines disestablished in 2015
Companies based in Tomsk
Defunct airlines of Russia